Computer Title Bout is a 1983 video game published by The Avalon Hill Game Company.

Gameplay
Computer Title Bout is a game in which 500 boxers are included with the game.

Reception
Rick Teverbaugh reviewed the game for Computer Gaming World, and stated that "Graphically, the game won't astonish you but it will impart enough information and action to let you imagination fill in the gaps. Overall, this is the boxing game that gets the most play in my ring."

References

External links
Review in Antic
Review in Commodore Microcomputers
Review in Electronic Games

1983 video games
Atari 8-bit family games
Avalon Hill video games
Boxing video games
Commodore 64 games
Video games based on real people
Video games developed in the United States